Jen Flynn Oldenburg (born July 26, 1978) is an American former volleyball player and current head coach of the Ohio State women's volleyball team.

Career
Before getting into coaching, Flynn Oldenburg was a four-year starter on the Ohio State University women's volleyball team. Additionally, she was a member of the United States women's national volleyball team. She played at the 2002 FIVB World championship, where team USA won a silver medal.

Coaching

University of Illinois: 2003-2012

She coached as an assistant for the University of Illinois from 2003 to 2012

Club

After Illinois, she spent six years as the club/associate director of the Pittsburgh Elite Volleyball Association. She was responsible for the day-to-day operations of the club, handled recruitment for potential collegiate athletes and worked as a private lessons instructor.

Ohio State University
In January 2020, Flynn Oldenburg was named the head coach of the Ohio State women's volleyball team.

In her first season as head coach, she was named Big Ten Coach of the Year after Ohio State finished 15–3 in league play and made the NCAA tournament's round of sixteen. In the same year, she coached Emily Londot, who was named the league's Freshman of the Year as well. She is the only head coach in Ohio State history to earn an appearance in the national tournament during their first year.

Head coaching record

External links
  USA - Player's biography

References

1978 births
Living people
American women's volleyball players
American volleyball coaches
Ohio State Buckeyes women's volleyball coaches
Ohio State Buckeyes women's volleyball players
Illinois Fighting Illini women's volleyball coaches
Volleyball players from Pennsylvania
Sportspeople from Pittsburgh